Public Bank Football Club  or Public Bank FC is a now defunct football club from Malaysia, based in Selayang, Selangor. The club home ground is the Majlis Perbandaran Selayang Stadium. The club formerly play in Malaysia Super League before pulled from the league after the end of 2005 season.

History
Public Bank Football Club  or Public Bank FC was owned by Public Bank Berhad. The club managed to win the Malaysia Premier League 2 title in 2003 and was promoted to the newly formed top division, the Malaysia Super League for 2004 season.

The club compete in the top division for two years, the 2004 and 2005 season. In their first season in the Super League, the club finished runners-up to Pahang. However, in the following year, the club finished 7th out of 8 clubs and were to be relegated to the second division, the Premier League.

At the end of 2005 season, the club has decided  to withdraw from the Malaysian League, citing financial difficulties. As a result, the club were then banned from entering all competitions organised by the Football Association of Malaysia (FAM) for 5 years.

Honours
 Malaysia Premier League 2
Winners (1): 2003
 Malaysia Super League
Runners-up (1): 2004

Coaches

See also
 Public Bank Berhad

References

External links
 Official homepage

Defunct football clubs in Malaysia
Football clubs in Malaysia
Financial services association football clubs in Malaysia